Antonio Piergüidi (born 25 August 1985 in Henderson, Buenos Aires Province, Argentina), is a football forward who most recently played for Quilmes in the Argentine 2nd division.

Piergüidi made 43 league appearances for Gimnasia y Esgrima de La Plata between 2006 and 2008, scoring 8 goals.

External links
 Argentine Primera statistics

1985 births
Living people
Sportspeople from Buenos Aires Province
Argentine footballers
Association football forwards
Club de Gimnasia y Esgrima La Plata footballers
Quilmes Atlético Club footballers